Esteury Ruiz (born February 15, 1999) is a Dominican professional baseball outfielder for the Oakland Athletics of Major League Baseball (MLB). He made his MLB debut in 2022 with the San Diego Padres and also played for the Milwaukee Brewers.

Career

Kansas City Royals
Ruiz signed with the Kansas City Royals as an international free agent in 2015. He made his professional debut in 2016 with the Dominican Summer League Royals and started 2017 with the Arizona League Royals.

San Diego Padres
On July 24, 2017, the Royals traded Ruiz, Matt Strahm and Travis Wood to the San Diego Padres for Trevor Cahill, Ryan Buchter and Brandon Maurer. He began his Padres career with the Arizona League Padres. He played 2018 with the Fort Wayne TinCaps and 2019 with the Lake Elsinore Storm. He did not play for a team in 2020 due to the Minor League Baseball season being cancelled because of the COVID-19 pandemic.

Ruiz returned in 2021 to play for the San Antonio Missions and returned there to start the 2022 season. On July 12, 2022, the Padres selected Ruiz to the major league roster.

Milwaukee Brewers
On August 1, 2022, the Padres traded Ruiz, Taylor Rogers, Dinelson Lamet and prospect Robert Gasser to the Milwaukee Brewers for Josh Hader. In 2022, he batted .332/.447/.526 in 437 at bats. Ruiz led the minor leagues in stolen bases, with 85, while being caught 14 times, and was third in the minor leagues in times hit by pitch with 27.

Oakland Athletics
On December 12, 2022, the Oakland Athletics acquired Ruiz from the Brewers in a three-team trade in which the Atlanta Braves acquired Sean Murphy, the Brewers acquired William Contreras, Joel Payamps, and Justin Yeager, and the Athletics also acquired Manny Piña, Kyle Muller, Freddy Tarnok, and Royber Salinas.

See also
 List of Major League Baseball players from the Dominican Republic

References

External links

1999 births
Living people
People from Azua Province
Major League Baseball players from the Dominican Republic
Major League Baseball outfielders
San Diego Padres players
Milwaukee Brewers players
Dominican Summer League Royals players
Arizona League Royals players
Arizona League Padres players
Fort Wayne TinCaps players
Lake Elsinore Storm players
San Antonio Missions players
Toros del Este players
El Paso Chihuahuas players
Nashville Sounds players